"Hold Me Down / Give Me Life" is a double A-side single released by English boy band JLS as the second single from the group's fourth studio album, Evolution. The single was released in the United Kingdom on 14 December 2012. The single peaked at #112 on the UK Singles Chart, becoming the band's worst performing single.

The group was originally slated to release 'Give Me Life' on 23 December, but opted for 'Hold Me Down' due to "fan demand".

Track listing

Credits and personnel
 Lead vocals – JLS
 Producers – Rodney Jerkins
 Lyrics – JLS, Rodney Jerkins, Wayne Hector, Eric Bellinger
 Label: Epic Records

Chart performance

Release history

References

External links 
JLS-Hold Me Down at Allmusic

2012 singles
JLS songs
Epic Records singles
Songs written by Eric Bellinger
Songs written by Rodney Jerkins
Songs written by Wayne Hector
Song recordings produced by Rodney Jerkins